Spójnia Świdwin is a Polish soccer club founded on 8 October 1969 in Świdwin, West Pomeranian Voivodeship, northwestern Poland. Club's department is on Sportowa 7 street. Team's coach is Wojciech Kędzierski.

History 

Club name is Spójnia Świdwin from 1969 (temporarily as Budowlani). Spójnia decrease took traditions from: Związkowiec (1946–1947), Zryw (to 1950), Kolejarz (1950–1959), Polonia (to 1962), Rega and Start. In 90's took part of active players from military soccer club Granit Świdwin (established 1963).

Achievements 

In season 1995/1996 Spójnia won IV league, but didn't participate in III league games.

External links 
 Team profile at ligowiec.net
 Official team page
 Spójnia Świdwin's players at pzpn.pl

Association football clubs established in 1969
1969 establishments in Poland
Football clubs in Poland
Świdwin County
Sport in West Pomeranian Voivodeship